Murray David Perahia  (born April 19, 1947) is an American pianist and conductor. He is widely considered one of the greatest living pianists. He was the first North American pianist to win the Leeds International Piano Competition, in 1972. Known as a leading interpreter of Bach, Handel, Scarlatti, Mozart, Beethoven, and Schumann, among other composers, Perahia has won numerous awards, including three Grammy Awards from a total of 18 nominations, and 9 Gramophone Awards in addition to its first and only "Piano Award".

Early life
Murray (Moshe) was born in the Bronx borough of New York City to a family of Sephardi Jewish origin. According to the biography on his Mozart piano sonatas CD, his first language was Judaeo-Spanish, or Ladino. The family came from Thessaloniki, Greece. His father moved to the United States in 1935.   
 
Perahia began studying the piano at age four, with a teacher, he said, who was "very limiting" because she made him play a single piece until it was perfect. He said his musical interests blossomed at age 15 for reasons he can't explain, and he began to practice seriously. At 17, Perahia attended Mannes College, where he studied keyboard, conducting, and composition with his teacher and mentor Mieczysław Horszowski. During the summer, he also attended the Marlboro Music School and Festival, where he studied with musicians Rudolf Serkin, Alexander Schneider, and Pablo Casals, among others. He played duets for piano four hands with Serkin, who later made Perahia his assistant at the Curtis Institute in Philadelphia, a position he held for over a year. 
 
In 1965, Perahia won the Young Concert Artists International Auditions. In 1972, he was the first North American to win first prize at the Leeds Piano Competition, helping to cement its reputation for advancing the careers of young pianistic talent. Fanny Waterman has commented (for Wendy Thompson's book Piano Competition: The Story of the Leeds) that Horszowski phoned her prior to the competition, and announced to her that Perahia would be the winner.

Music career
In 1973, Perahia worked with Benjamin Britten and Peter Pears at the Aldeburgh Festival, and with fellow pianist Radu Lupu. He was co-artistic director of the Festival from 1981 to 1989.   
    
In the 1980s, Perahia was invited to work with Vladimir Horowitz, an admirer of his art. Perahia says this had a defining influence on his pianism. He became close to Horowitz, whom he visited during the elder pianist's last four years to play for him.

From 1973 to 2010, Perahia recorded exclusively for Columbia Masterworks, now Sony Classical.  His first major recording project was Mozart's 27 piano concertos, conducted from the keyboard with the English Chamber Orchestra. In the 1980s, he also recorded Beethoven's five piano concertos, with Bernard Haitink and the Royal Concertgebouw Orchestra. In 2016, Perahia signed with Deutsche Grammophon.

Hand injuries
In 1990, Perahia suffered a cut to his right thumb, which became septic. He took antibiotics for this condition, but they affected his health. In 1992, his career was threatened by a bone abnormality in his hand causing inflammation, requiring several years away from the keyboard, and a series of operations. During that time, he says, he found solace through studying the music of Johann Sebastian Bach. After recovering, he produced a series of award-winning recordings of Bach's keyboard works in the late 1990s, including a notable rendition of the Goldberg Variations.

In early 2005, Perahia's hand problem recurred, prompting him to withdraw from the concert stage on the advice of his doctors. He cancelled several appearances at the Barbican Centre, as well as a 10-city national tour of the United States, but returned with recitals in German cities in 2006 and at the Barbican in April 2007.

In autumn of 2007, he completed a 10-city tour of the United States. Owing to his hand problem, and on the advice of his doctor, Perahia cancelled a February 2008 solo recital at the Barbican Centre and a tour in the United States with the Academy of St Martin in the Fields (March and April 2008). He returned to the platform in August 2008, touring with the Royal Concertgebouw Orchestra under the direction of Bernard Haitink, and had an Asian recital tour in October and November.

Recent activities
Perahia has recorded Chopin's études, and Schubert's late piano sonatas. He is currently editing a new Urtext edition of Beethoven's piano sonatas.

Besides his solo career, he is active in chamber music and appears regularly with the Guarneri and Budapest String Quartets. He is also Principal Guest Conductor of the Academy of St Martin in the Fields, with which he records and performs.

Since his return at the 2008 Proms season, Perahia has been continually active on the concert scene.

Perahia appeared at Sir Neville Marriner's 90th birthday concert on April 1, 2014, playing Mozart's Piano Concerto No. 20 in D minor, K 466 alongside the Academy of St Martin in the Fields conducted by Marriner.

After 43 years (1973–2016) with Sony Classical (and its predecessor, Columbia Masterworks), Perahia signed with the German label Deutsche Grammophon.  His first release for the label, Bach's French Suites, came out in October 2016.

Perahia's performance of Beethoven's Hammerklavier Sonata elicited this review from the Los Angeles Times:
Perahia threw himself into everything with a ferocious concentration. The opening left-hand leap to the fugue's landing on a triumphant final cadence 40 minutes later felt like a single gesture, a life passing by during a fall and safe landing off a cliff.
The epic Adagio was exceptional. Beethoven is in a black mood. The twisted harmonies and endless melodic lines keep shifting, trying to go one way and then the next, never finding resolution or solace. For Perahia this was inescapable pain, but not to be dwelt upon. His ability to find the life in each note proved intensely moving.

Jerusalem Music Center
In January 2009, Murray Perahia was appointed president of the Jerusalem Music Center established by violinist Isaac Stern. In an interview with Haaretz newspaper he said: "Music represents an ideal world where all dissonances resolve, where all modulations —that are journeys— return home, and where surprise and stability coexist."

Teaching 
Upon graduation from Mannes, Perahia was appointed to the faculty and taught there from 1969 to 1979. Perahia was invited to teach at the International Piano Foundation Theo Lieven (known today as the International Piano Academy Lake Como) to selected students. He has given masterclasses at such institutions as Juilliard School, Stanford University, and Peabody Institute, among many others. He held a Summer Course at the Jerusalem Music Centre in July 2017 to young Israeli pianists ages 12 to 18, including Niv Yehuda, Amir Ron, Yoav Levanon, Tom Borrow, Talmon Pachevsky, Yuval Shmila, and Tom Zalmanov. He continues to give frequent masterclasses as president of the JMC. He plans to hold a series of masterclasses in Munich on Beethoven Piano Sonatas, hosted by the renowned publisher G. Henle Verlag, with ten young professional pianists: Eden Agranat Meged, Elia Cecino, Yan Fang, Hyunji Kim, Song Hyeon Kim, Michael Lu, Nathalia Milstein, Misora Ozaki, Maksym Shadko, and Clara Isabella Siegle.

Personal life 
Perahia lives in London with his wife, Ninette Shohet, who is of Iraqi-Jewish heritage. He has two adult sons, Benjamin and Raphael.

Awards 
Leeds International Piano Competition
1972 Leeds International Piano Competition First Prize

Seventh International Schumann Festival
2000 Robert Schumann Society Claudio Arrau Memorial Medal

Grammy Award for Best Chamber Music Performance
1989 Bartók: Sonata for Two Pianos & Percussion

Grammy Award for Best Instrumental Soloist Performance
2003 Chopin: Études, Opp. 10, 25
1999 Bach: English Suites Nos. 1, 3 and 6

Gramophone Award
Gramophone Award for best concerto recording, 1984, Piano Concertos 15 and 16 of Wolfgang Amadeus Mozart 
Gramophone Award for best concerto recording, 1986, Piano Concertos 3 and 4 of Ludwig van Beethoven 
Gramophone Award for best instrumental recording, 1986, works of Franz Schubert and Wolfgang Amadeus Mozart with Radu Lupu
Gramophone Award for best instrumental recording, 1995, works of Frédéric Chopin 
Gramophone Award for best instrumental recording, 1996, works of George Frideric Handel and Domenico Scarlatti
Gramophone Award for best instrumental recording, 2001, Goldberg Variations by Johann Sebastian Bach
Gramophone Award for best instrumental recording, 2003, Etudes by Frédéric Chopin
Gramophone Award for best instrumental recording, 2011, piano music of Johannes Brahms
Gramophone Award for best instrumental recording, 2016, Six French Suites by Johann Sebastian Bach

Perahia is an Honorary Fellow of the Royal College of Music and Honorary Member of the Royal Academy of Music (1985). In 2007 he was elected to an Honorary Fellowship of Jesus College, Cambridge.

On March 8, 2004, Queen Elizabeth II made him an honorary Knight Commander of the Order of the British Empire. (This entitles him to use the post-nominal letters KBE, but not to the title "Sir".)

In 2012 he was voted into the inaugural Gramophone Hall of Fame.

In 2012 he was awarded the Jean Gimbel Lane Prize in Piano Performance from Northwestern University.

In 2013 he was awarded the Royal Academy of Music Bach Prize

In 2015 he was awarded the Wolf Prize in Arts (with Jessye Norman).

A species of solitary bee from Israel was named in his honour in 2016.

Discography

1970s
Schumann: Davidsbündlertänze, Op. 6; Fantasiestücke, Op. 12 (1973)
Chopin: The Chopin Preludes. (1975)
Schumann: Études Symphoniques op. 13 & Études Posthumes; Papillons (1977)

1980s
Schubert: Wanderer Fantasy, Op. 15; Schumann: Fantasy in C major, Op. 17 (1986)
Mozart, Beethoven: Quintets for piano and winds (1986)
Mozart: Sonata (K. 448); Schubert: Piano Sonata for four hands (1986; with Radu Lupu)
Beethoven: Piano Concertos Nos. 3 and 4 (1986)
Brahms: Piano Quartet (1987)
Beethoven: Piano Sonatas Nos. 17, 18 and 26 (1987)
Beethoven: Piano Concerto No. 5 (Emperor) (1987)
A Portrait of Murray Perahia (1987)
Mendelssohn: Piano Concertos Nos. 1 and 2 (CD 1987, but recorded in 1974 and originally issued on LP) — with Neville Marriner and the Academy of St. Martin in the Fields
Mozart: Piano Concertos Nos. 11, 12 and 14 (1987)
Mozart: Piano Concertos Nos. 22 and 24 (1987)
Chopin: Piano Concerto No. 1, Barcarolle, etc. (1987)
Beethoven: Piano Concertos Nos. 1 and 2 (1987)
Mozart: Piano Concertos Nos. 9 and 21 (1987)
Schumann: Symphonic Études, posthumous études, Papillons; Chopin: Piano Sonatas Nos. 2 and 3 (1988)
Schumann: Davidsbündlertänze; Fantasiestücke (1988)
Beethoven: The five piano concertos (1988) — with Bernard Haitink and the Royal Concertgebouw Orchestra
Schumann: Piano Sonata, Op. 22; Schubert: Piano Sonata, D. 959 (1988)
Bartók: Sonata for 2 Pianos and Percussion; Brahms: Variations on a Theme by Haydn (1988)
Schumann, Grieg: Piano concertos (1989)

1990s
Schubert: Impromptus (1990)
Chopin: Piano Concertos Nos. 1 and 2 (1990)
Murray Perahia in Performance (1991)
Murray Perahia Plays Franck and Liszt (1991)
Brahms: Sonata No. 3, Rhapsodies, etc. (1991)
Mozart: Concertos for 2 and 3 pianos, Andante and Variations for piano four hands (1991) with Radu Lupu
Mozart: Piano Concertos Nos. 21 and 27 (1991)
The Aldeburgh Recital (1991)
Mozart: Piano Sonatas (K. 310, 333, and 533) (1992)
Bach: Harpsichord Concertos (1993)
Immortal Beloved Original Motion Picture Soundtrack (1994)
Greatest Hits: Grieg (1994)
Chopin 4 Ballades: Waltzes Op 18&42, Nocturne Op 15, Mazurkas Op 7,17&33, Études Op 10                    Sony Classical #SK 64 399 (1994)
Beethoven: Piano Sonatas (Op. 2, Nos. 1–3) (1995)
Murray Perahia: 25th Anniversary Edition (1997)
Schumann: Kreisleriana, Piano Sonata No. 1 (1997)
Schumann: Complete works for piano and orchestra (1997) — with Claudio Abbado and the Berlin Philharmonic Orchestra
Murray Perahia Plays Handel and Scarlatti (1997)
Bach: English Suites Nos. 1, 3 and 6 (1998), Sony Classical 
Songs Without Words: Bach/Busoni, Mendelssohn and Schubert–Liszt (1999)
Mozart: Piano Concertos Nos. 20 and 27 (1999)
Glenn Gould at the Movies (1999)
Bach: English Suites Nos. 2, 4 and 5 (1999), Sony Classical

From 2000
Bach: Goldberg Variations (2000), Sony Classical
Chopin: Études (2001)
Bach: Keyboard Concertos Nos. 1, 2 and 4 (2001), Sony Classical
Bach: Keyboard Concertos Nos. 3, 5, 6, 7 (2002)
Schubert: Late Piano Sonatas (2003)
Murray Perahia Plays Bach (2003)
Beethoven: String Quartet, Op. 127; Piano Sonata, Op. 101 (2004) (The string quartet is transcribed for full string orchestra and conducted by Murray Perahia)
Bach: Partitas Nos. 2, 3, 4 (2008), Sony Classical
Bach: English Suites Nos. 1-6, BWV 806-811 (2008), Sony Classical
Beethoven: Piano Sonatas Op. 14, Nos. 1 and 2, Op. 26, Op. 28 (Pastorale) (2008), Sony Classical
Bach: Partitas Nos. 1, 5, 6 (2009), Sony Classical 
Mozart: Piano Concertos Nos. 17 & 18 (2009), Sony Classical
Brahms: Handel Variations; Two Rhapsodies, Op. 79; Six Piano Pieces, Op. 118; Four Piano Pieces, Op. 119 (2010)
Schumann: Piano Concerto in A Minor, Op. 54 - Grieg: Piano Concerto in A Minor, Op. 16 (2010), Sony Classical
Mozart: Piano Concertos Nos. 21, 23 & Rondos (2010), Sony Classical
Bach: French Suite No 5 (2011)
Beethoven: Piano Sonata No 27 Op 90 (2011)
Chopin: Mazurka C-Sharp Minor Op 30 No 4 (2011)
Bach: The French Suites (2016)
Beethoven: Piano Sonatas (2018)

Videography
Murray Perahia in Performance (1992)
Mozart: Piano Concertos Nos. 21 and 27 in rehearsal and performance (1992)
Schubert: Winterreise (with Dietrich Fischer-Dieskau)
Beethoven: Piano Concertos Nos. 1 and 3 (1988)
Beethoven: Piano Concertos Nos. 2 and 4 (1988)
Beethoven: Piano Concerto No. 5 (1988)

References

External links 

 Official site
 Page at Sony Classical
 Full Biography
 Masterclass with Murray Perahia at the 
 Interview with Murray Perahia by Bruce Duffie, March 13, 1997
 David Dubal interview with Murray Perahia, 3-Apr-1981
 Review of Murray Perahia's recording of Beethoven's Hammerklavier Sonata, in the Classical Music Records Reviews blog

1947 births
Living people
20th-century American conductors (music)
20th-century classical pianists
20th-century Sephardi Jews
21st-century American conductors (music)
21st-century classical pianists
21st-century Sephardi Jews
American classical pianists
American male classical pianists
American male conductors (music)
American expatriates in the United Kingdom
American people of Greek-Jewish descent
American Sephardic Jews
Conductors (music) awarded knighthoods
Fiorello H. LaGuardia High School alumni
Grammy Award winners
Honorary Knights Commander of the Order of the British Empire
Honorary Members of the Royal Academy of Music
Jewish American classical musicians
Jewish classical pianists
Musicians awarded knighthoods
Musicians from New York City
People from the Bronx
Prize-winners of the Leeds International Pianoforte Competition
Winners of the Royal Academy of Music/ Kohn Foundation Bach Prize
Wolf Prize in Arts laureates
20th-century American pianists
21st-century American pianists
Classical musicians from New York (state)
20th-century American male musicians
21st-century American male musicians
21st-century American Jews